Leucosyke is a genus of flowering plants belonging to the family Urticaceae.

Its native range is Tropical and Subtropical Asia to Southern Pacific.

Species:

Leucosyke arcuatovenosa 
Leucosyke aspera 
Leucosyke benguetensis 
Leucosyke bornensis 
Leucosyke brunnescens 
Leucosyke buderi 
Leucosyke capitellata 
Leucosyke caudata 
Leucosyke celebica 
Leucosyke clemensii 
Leucosyke corymbulosa 
Leucosyke elmeri 
Leucosyke forbesii 
Leucosyke hispidissima 
Leucosyke javanica 
Leucosyke kjellbergii 
Leucosyke media

References

Urticaceae
Urticaceae genera